Tyler Maxwell Steen (born June 24, 2000) is an American football offensive tackle. He played college football at Vanderbilt before transferring to Alabama in 2022.

Early years
Steen was born on June 24, 2000, in Miami, Florida. He is the oldest of three sons to Samantha Steen, Esq, an attorney, and Daris Steen, a retired member of the U.S. Marine Corps. Steen attended St. Thomas Aquinas High School in Fort Lauderdale He played both offense and defense on the St. Thomas Aquinas High School football team. Steen was also a member of the track and field team..

College career

Vanderbilt 
Steen enrolled at Vanderbilt University in 2018, playing four games at defensive end as a freshman for their football team, recording one tackle. He moved to right tackle as a sophomore in 2019 before moving to left tackle as a junior. Steen started thirty-four of thirty-eight games played at Vanderbilt, receiving All-SEC honors twice.

Alabama 
In 2022, Steen was a graduate transfer to the University of Alabama to play his final season of eligibility for the Crimson Tide. He started all thirteen regular season games for Alabama.  Steen would be named second-team All-SEC and started in the 2023 Senior Bowl.

Personal Life
Steen has two young brothers, Blake (2004) and Dylan Steen (2008). Blake is a member of the University of Virginia football team.

Sgt. Rodney Maxwell Davis Legacy
Steen has the middle name of his grandfather, Sgt. Rodney Maxwell Davis. Davis joined the Marine Corps in 1961, and was ordered to the Republic of Vietnam in 1967. In September 1967, during a search and destroy exercise as part of Operation Swift, Davis's company was attacked by enemies. When Davis's platoon retreated into a trench, Davis ran up and down his company's line and encouraged the men to fight, returning fire at the same time. When an enemy grenade came close to several men, Davis died when he jumped on the grenade, saving his men's lives. Sgt. Davis saved his fellow Marines in this selfless act and thus earned the nation's highest military decoration: the Medal of Honor.

Presentation of the medal was made posthumously to Davis's widow, Mrs. Judy P. Davis, by Vice President Spiro T. Agnew in his office. The presentation is "in the name of the Congress of the United States."[1]

Davis was survived by his wife, Judy, and two daughters, Nichola Davis and Samantha J. Davis-Steen, Esq.

The frigate USS Rodney M. Davis (FFG-60) was named in his honor. The decommissioned USS Rodney M. Davis hit by a missile as part of 2022 RIMPAC exercises. (U.S. Navy, courtesy DVIDS) [4]

References

External links
 Alabama Crimson Tide bio
 Vanderbilt Commodores bio

2000 births
Living people
American football defensive ends
American football offensive tackles
Players of American football from Miami
Alabama Crimson Tide football players
Vanderbilt Commodores football players
St. Thomas Aquinas High School (Florida) alumni